Clavularia is a genus of corals in the family Clavulariidae.  They are often referred by the common names star polyps or clove polyps.

Species
There are 69 accepted species in this genus:

 Clavularia alba (Grieg, 1888)
 Clavularia arctica (Sars, 1860)
 Clavularia armata Thomson, 1927
 Clavularia australiensis Hickson, 1894
 Clavularia bathybius (Saville Kent, 1870)
 Clavularia borealis Koren & Danielsen, 1883
 Clavularia capensis (Studer, 1879)
 Clavularia carpediem Weinberg, 1986
 Clavularia charoti (Tixier-Durivault & d'Hondt, 1974)
 Clavularia concreta Studer, 1901
 Clavularia crassa (Milne Edwards, 1848)
 Clavularia crosslandi Thomson & Henderson, 1906
 Clavularia cylindrica Wright & Studer, 1889
 Clavularia delicatula Thomson & Dean, 1931
 Clavularia densum (Tixier-Durivault & d'Hondt, 1974)
 Clavularia desjardiniana (Templeton, 1835)
 Clavularia diademata Broch, 1939
 Clavularia dispersa Kükenthal, 1906
 Clavularia durum Hickson, 1930
 Clavularia eburnea Kükenthal, 1906
 Clavularia elongata Wright & Studer, 1889
 Clavularia expansa Thomson & Dean, 1931
 Clavularia filiformis (Sars, 1856)
 Clavularia filippi (Kölliker, 1864)
 Clavularia flava May, 1899
 Clavularia frankliniana Roule, 1902
 Clavularia frigida Danielssen, 1887
 Clavularia garcia Hickson, 1894
 Clavularia grandiflora (Nutting, 1908)
 Clavularia griegii Madsen, 1944
 Clavularia inflata Schenk, 1896
 Clavularia koellikeri (Dean, 1927)
 Clavularia laxa Tixier-Durivault, 1966
 Clavularia levidensis Madsen, 1944
 Clavularia longissima May, 1898
 Clavularia magelhaenica Studer, 1878
 Clavularia margaritaceum (Grieg, 1888)
 Clavularia margaritferae Thomson & Henderson, 1905
 Clavularia marioni (Von Koch, 1891)
 Clavularia mikado Utinomi, 1955
 Clavularia modesta (Verrill, 1874)
 Clavularia mollis Thomson & Henderson, 1906
 Clavularia morbesbii Hickson, 1915
 Clavularia multispiculosa Utinomi, 1955
 Clavularia notanda Tixier-Durivault, 1964
 Clavularia novaezealandiae Brewin, 1945
 Clavularia ornata Thomson & Dean, 1931
 Clavularia pacifica Kükenthal, 1913
 Clavularia parva Tixier-Durivault, 1964
 Clavularia parvula Thomson & Henderson, 1906
 Clavularia peterseni Kükenthal, 1906
 Clavularia pregnans Thomson & Henderson, 1906
 Clavularia primula (Dana, 1846)
 Clavularia pulchra Thomson & Henderson, 1906
 Clavularia purpurascens (Dana, 1846)
 Clavularia racemosa Utinomi, 1950
 Clavularia ramosa Hickson, 1894
 Clavularia repens Thomson & Henderson, 1906
 Clavularia reptans Hickson, 1894
 Clavularia rigida Broch, 1935
 Clavularia spongicola Utinomi, 1955
 Clavularia stormi Koren & Danielsen, 1883
 Clavularia strumosa (Dana, 1846)
 Clavularia tenuis Tixier-Durivault & d´Hondt, 1974
 Clavularia thalassanthos (Lesson, 1830)
 Clavularia thompsoni Benham, 1928
 Clavularia venustella Madsen, 1944
 Clavularia viridis (Quoy & Gaimard, 1833)
 Clavularia zanzibarensis Thomson & Henderson, 1906

References

Octocorallia genera
Clavulariidae